The Container Store Group, Inc. is an American specialty retail chain company that operates The Container Store, which offers storage and organization products, and custom closets.
The company has made Fortune'''s list of "100 Best Companies to Work For" in each of the past 17 years, through 2016.

In February 2007, its owners announced that they were "exploring alternatives," including selling the company to private investors, in order to fund future growth. They stated that they would not sell unless they received guarantees that the corporate culture would be preserved. On July 2, 2007, the company announced that they had closed a deal with a private equity firm based in Los Angeles, Leonard Green & Partners, which obtained a majority stake.

History

Garrett Boone and Kip Tindell met while working in the paint department of Montgomery Ward. On July 1, 1978, The Container Store opened in a small, retail space in Dallas. Kip Tindell (Chairman and CEO), Garrett Boone (Chairman Emeritus), and architect John Mullen opened a retail store offering a mix of products devoted to helping people simplify their lives. In doing so, they originated a new category of retailing (storage and organization). Initial cash capital was provided by Garrett, his father, and John Mullen, who were founding directors, officers and shareholders of the company. In 1999, the company bought one of its main suppliers, Elfa International, a Swedish corporation that specialized in shelving and storage units.

The first store location outside Texas opened in Atlanta, Georgia in April 1991.  By December 1998, the chain had grown to 18 stores in operation.  In October 2000, its first New York metropolitan area store opened.  As of November 2004, it had 33 locations, and reached 38 with the opening of the first Los Angeles area location in October 2006.

Following the deal with Leonard Green & Partners, announced in July 2007, the company announced plans to open 29 more stores in the next five years. The first Arkansas location (Little Rock) opened in March 2008, followed by the first Arizona location (Scottsdale) in the summer, and the first Minnesota location (Edina) and second Ohio location (Cincinnati) that fall. 

In 2013, the retailer was one of the hottest IPOs of 2013. However, according to Forbes'', "the Container Store is a far cry from the 300 store potential investors were promised in the IPO." Since 2013, only 30 stores were added, or about 5 per year. The company hasn’t kept its promise to investors "to be the category killer of storage containers and home organization."

As of May 2016, The Container Store had 80 locations, with plans to open several stores in the following months. On May 9, 2016, the company announced that Kip Tindell would be stepping down as CEO and would be succeeded by COO and president Melissa Reiff.

On December 22, 2020, The Container Store Group, Inc. announced that retail executive Satish Malhotra would succeed Melissa Reiff as CEO and president on February 1, 2021. Effective March 1, 2021, Reiff retired from the company, while retaining her position as chairwoman of the board of directors until the annual meeting of shareholders in late summer 2021.

See also
 Hold Everything (store), chain that closed in 2006
 Organized Living, chain that closed in 2005
 Storables

References

External links
 

Private equity portfolio companies
Retail companies of the United States
Companies based in Coppell, Texas
Companies listed on the New York Stock Exchange
2013 initial public offerings
American companies established in 1978
Retail companies established in 1978
1978 establishments in Texas